In geometry, a fractal canopy, a type of fractal tree, is one of the easiest-to-create types of fractals. Each canopy  is created by splitting a line segment into two smaller segments at the end (symmetric binary tree), and then splitting the two smaller segments as well, and so on, infinitely. Canopies are distinguished by the angle between concurrent adjacent segments and ratio between lengths of successive segments.

A fractal canopy must have the following three properties:
The angle between any two neighboring line segments is the same throughout the fractal.
The ratio of lengths of any two consecutive line segments is constant.
Points all the way at the end of the smallest line segments are interconnected, which is to say the entire figure is a connected graph.
The pulmonary system used by humans to breathe resembles a fractal canopy, as do trees, blood vessels, viscous fingering, electrical breakdown, and crystals with appropriately adjusted growth velocity from seed.

See also
 Brownian tree
 Dendrite (crystal)
 Lichtenberg figure
 H tree

References

External links
 from a student-generated Oracle Thinkquest website

Fractals
L-systems